Metaxourgeio or Metaxourgio, meaning "silk mill", is a neighbourhood of Athens, Greece. The neighbourhood is located north of the historical centre of Athens, between Kolonos to the east and Kerameikos to the west, and north of Gazi. Metaxourgeio is frequently described as a transition neighbourhood. After a long period of abandonment in the late 20th century, the area is acquiring a reputation as an artistic and fashionable neighbourhood due to the opening of many art galleries, museums, and trendy restaurants and cafes. Moreover, local efforts to beautify and invigorate the neighbourhood have reinforced a budding sense of community and artistic expression. Anonymous art pieces containing quotes and sayings in both English and Ancient Greek have begun springing up throughout the neighbourhood, containing statements such as "Art for art's sake" (Τεχνη τεχνης χαριν). Guerrilla gardening has also helped to beautify this area, taking advantage of the ample sunshine in Greece. The heart of the neighborhood is Avdi Square, which draws residents and visitors with its open space, greenery, periodic festivals and gatherings, and adjacent restaurants, theatres and art gallery.

History

Metaxourgeio is built on the Dimosio Sima, the ancient cemetery of eminent Athenians. For centuries, the area was largely rural and stood on the outskirts of the city. The construction of the Metaxourgeio factory in the early 19th century paved the way for the neighbourhood's inclusion in the larger urban area. During the course of Athens' dramatic growth in the late 19th century, Metaxourgeio became a thriving working-class neighbourhood, housing many craftsmen, tradesmen, and small-business owners. The population of the neighbourhood continued to grow during the course of the early twentieth century, maintaining its working-class profile, until a period of abandonment beginning in the 1970s. Metaxourgeio's abrupt population decrease during this period reflects the larger situation in Athens, when many inhabitants moved to cities within the region but outside of the capital. A lack of building renewal and restrictive traffic regulations exacerbated this trend in Metaxourgeio. Continuing into the 1980s, the area's image of abandonment combined with a decrease in employment opportunities further discouraged new inhabitants.

By 2001, the population of the neighbourhood had stabilised, largely due to an influx of immigrants as well as upper middle-class residents who found the area's low rents and proximity to high-profile meeting places attractive. In the period leading up to the 2004 Olympic games, renovation projects and infrastructure rebuilding throughout Athens extended to Metaxourgeio as well, which further attracted new higher-income residents.

Since January 2000, the district has been connected with the Athens metropolitan line 2.

People

Alekos Fassianos (born 1935) is a well-recognised and celebrated Greek painter whose work "The Myth of my neighbourhood,” on exhibit at the Metaxourgeio Metro station, leads us to a world full of colours and images of another era.  Since his first Athens exhibition in 1959 he has held more than 70 personal exhibitions in Paris, Athens, Thessaloniki, Milan, New York, London, Tokyo, Beirut, Hamburg, Munich and elsewhere. Apart from painting he has worked on scribing, poster creation, illustration of books and various publication in Greece and abroad.

Anthony Samarakis was born in Athens in 1919. He studied law at Athens University. With great social activity he was one of the most famous Greeks both as a writer and as an active citizen.

Vicky Moscholiou is a famous Greek singer born in the Metaxourgeio neighbourhood of Athens singer born in 1943. She was commonly described as having a "different" voice. She rose to fame in 1964 with Stavros Xarhakos' song "Hathike to feggari" (The Moon is Lost), which was composed for the movie Lola. Two of her hits gave their names to night clubs in Athens, "Deilina" (Afternoons) and "Ximeromata" (Daybreaks). She was one of the first in Greece to sing both in night clubs and concerts, and she has also sung in the royal courts of Greece, Persia and Jordan. She was also one of the first entertainers to sing in aid of Cyprus.

Giorgos Zampetas was born in 1925 in Metaxourgeio and is credited as being one of the greatest bouzouki artists, as well as a composer and singer. He showed musical interest from a young age, secretly playing his bouzouki in his father's barber shop. At age 7 he won a school contest by playing his first song.

Tassos Livaditis (April 1922- Oct 1988) was a poet born in Metaxourgeio whose poetry has been made famous as lyrics by the musician Mikis Theodorakis.

Sotiris Spatharis (born 1892) Spatharis born on the island of Santorini in 1892. At a young age he moved to the Metaxourgio section of Athens, where he learned the art of the shadow theatre from Theodoros Theodorellos, a pupil of Mimaros. In 1950, Spatharis started writing his memoirs that were first published in 1960 giving historians much material on the origins and development of the shadow theatre. He died on April 17, 1974, holding tightly in his arms his figure of the Pasha.

Aristomenis Provelengios (1914–1999) is a celebrated Greek architect who served for a period of time beginning in 1962, as the President of the Hellenic Institute of Architects. His work can still be seen at the Au Revoir on Patission Street which is one of the last of the old cafe-bars, a small monument to a time when Kypseli was the place to be and a popular stop for a drink after the theaters let out.

G. Tsakiris is accredited as "the business man who taught the Greek to eat potato crisps." In 1954 he began production of his potato crisps in the 2x3 metre room where he lived. By 2003 his company was so successful that it was purchased by Coca-Cola.

Marika Kotopouli (3 May 1887 - 3 September 1954) is a notable and accomplished Athens-born actress. She was one of four girls in her family, and together with their parents, they comprised the “Troupe progress.” In order to give the impression that Troupe Progress was not a closed troupe, all of the children except for Marika, were given stage names. By age 14 she had already received good criticism from the acting community, and in 1901 she left her family's troupe to perform with the Trope Royal, which was a rival troupe. By 1908 she had established her own performance troupe, making their first appearance as “Troupe Marika Koopouli”. In 1912 she rented the Theater Omonia, which during this time was renamed Theater Kotopouli. In 1921 she was honoured with the Gold Cross of the Order of George I and with the Education Ministry's arts and letters prize in 1923. In 1933 she acted in her one and only film production, which was a Greek-Turkish movie, titled “Kakos dromos” or “Bad Road” in English. In 1936 a new theater, the Rex Theater Kotopouli Stage was built for her troupe on the famous Panepistimiou Street, and is still in use today. In 1951 the Marika Kotopouli Award was founded and is awarded as an honour to Greek actors. Her final stage performance was in March 1953  in Syros. Marika Kotopouli died on 3 September 1954, aged 67.

In 1990 with the help and support of the Association of Greek Actors, the home in which Kotopouli grew up, was restored and converted into the Marika Kotopouli Museum. This museum does not house relics of her life, but rather serves to preserve the site which is of historic value, and exhibits modern art.

Zeta Makripoulia (born in 1978) is an actress, television presenter and radio DJ. After appearances in a considerable number of television series and plays, she achieved access to a much broader audience and critical acclaim with the success of the popular Greek television series Sto Para Pente. Makripoulia appeared in three cinematic productions between 2008 and 2010. Her appearance on the Eurovision Song Contest 2006 in Athens, Greece was broadcast to a worldwide audience.

Landmarks and attractions

The metamorphosis of the Metaxourgeio neighbourhood owes a great deal to the efforts of individual artists and small-business owners, whose galleries, small theatres, and restaurants have helped create the atmosphere of artistic resurgence that now characterises the area.  While the adjacent neighbourhoods of Psirri and Gazi experienced significant renovation via new zoning laws encouraging recreational establishments like night clubs, bars, and restaurants, Metaxourgeio's resurgence is due to the individual efforts of many of the following businesses.

Art galleries
 Municipal Gallery of Athens (Myllerou 32 & Leonidou, Avdi Square) - Open in this location since October 2010, this 1500 m2 gallery is housed in a renovated 19th-century building by Hans Christian Hansen. (Prior to October 2010, the gallery was located on Peiraios street on Eleftherias (Koumondourou) Square.)
 Rebecca Camhi Gallery (Leonidou 9) - Open since 1995, this gallery housed in a neoclassical building features contemporary art in all media.
 The Breeder (Iasonos 45) - Features contemporary art.
 Vamiali's gallery (Samou 1) - First contemporary art gallery in the district since 2004, is housed in a renovated building.

Theatres
 Kunsthalle Athena (Kerameikou 28) - An open courtyard space featuring theatre and music performances.
 Metaxourgeio (Akadimou 16) - A multi-venue performance space featuring a theatre, music bar and restaurant.
 Apo Mihanis Theatro (Akadimou 13)
 Theatro Attis (Leonidou 7) - Contemporary theatre.
 Synergeio (Leonidou 15) - Contemporary theatre.
 Rabbithole Theatre(Germanikou 20)
 The Endorfini(Virginias Benaki 7) - Endorfini is a theatre and bar which features live musical performances and experimental stage plays in a state-of the art environment.

Architecture and street art
A walk through Metaxourgeio reveals the rise, fall and resurgence of the neighbourhood through its architecture and art. The narrow streets of the neighbourhood and the occasional cobblestone pedestrian alleys help create a village ambience. Large modern buildings stand next to crumbling, abandoned buildings retaining ornate neoclassical elements. Some of the latter have been salvaged and restored for performance spaces and restaurants. Street art can be found everywhere, ranging from the contributions of professional artists during the ReMap 2 project to the works of anonymous artists adding interesting touches to brick walls, dilapidated buildings and public green spaces.

Miscellaneous
 Open-air market - Held every Monday on Kerameikos St., this large market offers a vital source of fresh produce for the neighbourhood.
 Chinatown - Numerous Asian grocery stores and clothing outlets can be found in Metaxourgeio between Kolonou and Kolokynthous streets.
 Student housing - With the goal of creating a student complex centred on 34 Marathonos St., an architectural competition was held in 2010 for architects under the age of 35.
 Immigrants' school on Sundays

References
	
 https://web.archive.org/web/20030507150005/http://www.mdaf.pwp.blueyonder.co.uk/MDAF/Alecos_Fassianos.htm

External links
 https://maps.google.com/maps/ms?f=q&source=s_q&hl=en&geocode=&vps=4&jsv=291b&ie=UTF8&hq=&hnear=Leonidou+9,+Athina+10437,+Athina,+Greece&oe=UTF8&msa=33&msid=116721685921984962327.0004940eb0cab33c524b2&abauth=4cd43851aCErAPkRl5Ijtc30YAlO_FmwgAM
 http://subway.umka.org/map-athens/line-2/metaxourgio.html
 http://www.kgonis.com/english/projects/thysseio.htm

Neighbourhoods in Athens